Tunisia competed in the 2008 Summer Olympics held in Beijing, People's Republic of China from August 8 to August 24, 2008. The country was  represented by 28 athletes competing in 10 sports.

Medalists

Athletics

Key
 Note – Ranks given for track events are within the athlete's heat only
 Q = Qualified for the next round
 q = Qualified for the next round as a fastest loser or, in field events, by position without achieving the qualifying target
 NR = National record
 N/A = Round not applicable for the event
 Bye = Athlete not required to compete in round

Men
Track & road events

Women
Track & road events

Field events

Boxing

Tunisia qualified five boxers for the Olympic boxing tournament. All five boxers qualified at the first African qualifier.

Cycling

Road

Fencing

Women

Judo

Men

Women

Swimming

Men

Women

Taekwondo

Tennis

Weightlifting

Wrestling

Key
  - Victory by Fall.
  - Decision by Points - the loser with technical points.
  - Decision by Points - the loser without technical points.

Men's freestyle

Men's Greco-Roman

Women's freestyle

See also
 Tunisia at the 2008 Summer Paralympics

References

Nations at the 2008 Summer Olympics
2008
Summer Olympics